Imre Józsa (18 March 1954 – 30 October 2016) was a Hungarian actor and voice actor. He was awarded many prizes such as Jászai Mari-Prize.

Hungarian actors
1954 births
2016 deaths